Sibbald is a surname of Scottish origin. It was first used by the descendants of Dominus Sylbaldus. Notable people with the surname include:

Barbara Sibbald (born 1958), Canadian novelist and freelance journalist
Bobby Sibbald (born 1948), English footballer
Craig Sibbald (born 1995), Scottish footballer
Sir John Sibbald (1833–1905) Scottish physician
Robert Sibbald (1641–1722), Scottish physician and antiquary

References

Surnames of Scottish origin